Pablo Andres Torresagasti (born August 5, 1980, in Resistencia, Argentina) is an Argentine football player currently playing for Rionegro Águilas of the Primera División in Colombia .

Teams
  12 de Octubre 2002
  Club Atlético Tembetary 2003
  Club Sport Colombia 2004
  Textil Mandiyú 2004-2005
  Sportivo Patria 2005
  Deportes Concepción 2006
  Boca Unidos 2006
  Defensores de Belgrano  2006-2012
  Sportivo Carapeguá 2013
  Libertad 2014–

References
 

1980 births
Living people
Argentine footballers
Argentine expatriate footballers
12 de Octubre Football Club players
Boca Unidos footballers
Deportes Concepción (Chile) footballers
Expatriate footballers in Chile
Expatriate footballers in Paraguay
Association footballers not categorized by position
People from Resistencia, Chaco
Sportspeople from Chaco Province